Property Week is a UK business-to-business magazine which reports on the worldwide commercial and residential property market. It reports news, features and analysis and the latest information from the industry - from development opportunities to investment prospects, professional and legal coverage to regional surveys, plus vacancies.

Profile
Property Week was first published in 1994. The magazine is based in London. The former owners of the magazine were Builder Group and CPM Group. It is published by Metropolis Business Publishing – part of Metropolis International – having belonged to United Business Media between 2003 and September 2013. The magazine is currently edited by Lem Bingley. The magazine has a global edition published on a quarterly basis. It attracts an audience of nearly 40,000 across its print and online products. The magazine is based at Davis House in central Croydon.

Events
Property Week hosts a range of events across the country, internationally and online including B2B conferences, award ceremonies and exhibitions in the market.

The awards dinners attract more than 1000 industry leaders to various locations across the country and are compared by personalities such as Michael Parkinson, Stephen Fry and Jonathan Ross

In 2018, Property Week launched its RESI Trailblazers Awards which are announced at its annual RESI Conference.

Awards
2012: 
Business Website of the Year - Association of Online Publishers
Magazine of the year - LSL Property Press.

2011:
Digital edition of the year - PPA

2010:
Magazine of the year award - IBP

Property Week also won the PPA weekly business magazine of the year in 2009 (and in 2007)

References

External links
 Property Week website

1994 establishments in the United Kingdom
Business magazines published in the United Kingdom
Magazines established in 1994
Magazines published in London
Professional and trade magazines
Weekly magazines published in the United Kingdom